GRB2-associated-binding protein 1 is a protein that in humans is encoded by the GAB1 gene.

Function 

The protein encoded by this gene is a member of the IRS1-like multisubstrate docking protein family. The encoded protein is an important mediator of branching tubulogenesis and plays a central role in cellular growth response, transformation and apoptosis. Two transcript variants encoding different isoforms have been found for this gene. GAB1 is involved also in the tonic pAKT activity in malignant B cells, and induces PI3K activation irrespectively of BCR stimulation by antigen.

Interactions 

GAB1 has been shown to interact with:

 CRKL, 
 Grb2, 
 MAP3K3,
 PIK3R1, 
 PLCG1  and
 PTPN11.

References

Further reading